Robert, Bob, Bobby, or Rob Morrison may refer to:

Academics
 Robert Hall Morrison (1798–1889), president of Davidson College
 Robert J. H. Morrison (born 1961), Canadian academic
 Rob Morrison (scientist) (born 1942), Australian zoological researcher and science communicator
 Robert G. Morrison (born 1969), professor of religion

Sportspeople
 Bob Morrison (footballer) (1869–1891), Irish footballer with Linfield
 Bobby Morrison (American football) (born 1945), American college football player and coach 
 Bobby Morrison (footballer, born 1896) (1896–1974), English footballer
 Bobby Morrison (footballer, born 1933) (1933–1999), Scottish footballer with Falkirk, Rangers, Workington 
 Robert Morrison (soccer) (1883–1952), Scottish-American soccer player
 Robert Morrison (rower) (1902–1980), British rower
 Robert Morrison (footballer) (1926–2016), New Zealand footballer

Politicians
 Robert F. Morrison (1826–1887), 13th Chief Justice of the Supreme Court of California
 Robert Morrison, 1st Baron Morrison (1881–1953), British Labour Party politician
 Robert Morrison (politician) (1909–1999), Arizona Attorney General 1955–1960
 Rob Morrison (politician) (born 1956), Canadian politician

Other people
 Robert Morrison (missionary) (1782–1834), Protestant missionary
 Robert Morrison (Phi Delta Theta) (1822–1902), one of the founders of Phi Delta Theta
 Bob Morrison (songwriter) (born 1942), American country songwriter 
 Rob Morrison (journalist), American television journalist and news anchor

See also
 Robbie Morrison, 21st-century British comics writer
 Robert Morison (1620–1683), Scottish botanist
 Robert Morrison MacIver (1882–1970), Scottish-born American sociologist